The Taichung Municipal Cingshuei Senior High School is the only public high school in Qingshui District, Taichung, Taiwan. It has 1679 pupils in 42 classes.

History
The school was founded in March 1946 named Taichung County Cingshuei High School.

In 1952, the school was transferred to the Taiwan Provincial Government, and renamed Taiwan Provincial Cingshuei High School.

In 1968, renamed Taiwan Provincial Cingshuei Senior High School.

In 2000, due to the "Government Reformation" the school was managed by the central government under Ministry of Education, and renamed National Cingshuei Senior High School.

In 2017, the school was transferred to the Taichung City Government, and renamed Taichung Municipal Cingshuei Senior School.

Famous Alumni
Paul Ching Wu Chu
Chen Wen-tsuen
Robert Tsao
Peter Tsai
Liao I-chiu
Li Jing (TV presenter)
Tsai Chi-chang

See also
 Education in Taiwan

References

1946 establishments in Taiwan
Educational institutions established in 1946
High schools in Taiwan